Thomas Corrigan may refer to:
Thomas C. Corrigan (1938–2022), American politician
Thomas Corrigan (priest) (1928–2011), Irish Anglican priest
Tom Corrigan (Australian politician) (1884–1952), Labor member of the Victorian Legislative Assembly
Tommy Corrigan (1903–1943), Australian rules footballer
Tom Corrigan (jockey) (1854–1894), Australian Hall of Fame jockey
Thomas Corrigan (transit executive), owner of company that had the franchise to operate one of Kansas City's early Streetcar systems
Tomás Corrigan (born 1990), Gaelic footballer